Zaawia Stadium is a multi-purpose stadium in Zawiya, Libya. The stadium holds 14,000 people.

It is currently used mostly for football matches and is the home ground of Al Olympic Zaouia.

References 

Football venues in Libya
Multi-purpose stadiums in Libya
Tripolitania
Zawiya, Libya

ar:الملعب الأولمبي